John Fisher (4 August 1897 – 1954) was an English professional association footballer who played as a winger.

References

1897 births
1954 deaths
People from Whitwell, Derbyshire
Footballers from Derbyshire
English footballers
Association football midfielders
Chesterfield F.C. players
Burnley F.C. players
Mansfield Town F.C. players
Lincoln City F.C. players
English Football League players